Swansea City Association Football Club is a Welsh professional football club based in the city of Swansea, south Wales, that play in the EFL Championship. They play their home matches at the Swansea.com Stadium.

The club was founded in 1912 as Swansea Town and joined the Football League in 1921. The club changed their name in 1969, when it adopted the name Swansea City to reflect Swansea's new status as a city.

The list encompasses the major honours won by Swansea City, records set by the club, their managers and their players, and details of their performance in European competition. The player records section itemises the club's leading goalscorers and those who have made most appearances in first-team competitions. It also records notable achievements by Swansea players on the international stage, and the highest transfer fees paid and received by the club. Attendance records at the Vetch Field and Swansea.com Stadium are also included.

Honours 

Swansea City's honours include the following:

The Football League
 English second tier (currently Football League Championship)
Promoted (1): 1980–81
Play-off winners (1): 2010–11
 English third tier (currently Football League One)
Winners (3): 1924–25, 1948–49, 2007–08
Promoted (1): 1978–79
 English fourth tier (currently Football League Two)
Winners (1): 1999–2000
Promoted (3): 1969–70, 1977–78, 2004–05
Play-off winners (1): 1987–88

Domestic Cup Competition
Football League Cup
Winners (1): 2012–13
 FA Cup
Semi-finalists (2): 1925–26, 1963–64
 Football League Trophy
Winners (2): 1993–94, 2005–06
 Welsh Cup
Winners (10): 1912–13, 1931–32, 1949–50, 1960–61, 1965–66, 1980–81, 1981–82, 1982–83, 1988–89, 1990–91
Runners-up (8): 1914–15, 1925–26, 1937–38, 1939–40, 1948–49, 1955–56, 1956–57, 1968–69
 FAW Premier Cup
Winners (2): 2004–05, 2005–06
Runners-up (2): 2000–01, 2001–02

European Competition
UEFA Cup Winners' Cup
Qualification: 1961–62, 1966–67, 1981–82, 1982–83, 1983–84, 1989–90, 1991–92
UEFA Europa League
Qualification: 2013-14

Domestic Youth Cup Competition
FAW Welsh Youth Cup
Winners (13): 1999, 2003, 2008, 2010, 2011, 2012, 2013, 2014, 2015, 2016, 2017, 2018, 2019
Runners-up (6): 1990, 1991, 1994, 1996, 2004, 2009

Player records

Appearances 
 Youngest first-team player: Nigel Dalling, 15 years 289 days (against Southport, Fourth Division, 6 December 1974).
 Oldest first-team player: Tommy Hutchison, 43 years, 172 days (against Southend United, Third Division, 12 March 1991).

Most appearances

League matches only. To matches played 14 November 2017.

 Goalscorers 
 Most goals in a season in all competitions: 40, by Cyril Pearce in 1931–32
 Most league goals in a top-flight season: 34, by Bob Latchford in 1982–83
 Most League goals in a season: 35, by Cyril Pearce in 1931–32
 Most League goals in a 38-game season: 18, by Michu in 2012–13
 Most goals in a competitive match: 5, by Jack Fowler against Charlton Athletic, Third Division (South), 27 December 1924.
 Most hat-tricks: 9, by Jack Fowler between 1924 and 1927.

 Overall scorers League matches only. To matches played 2 February 2013.

Transfers 
For consistency, fees in the record transfer tables below are all sourced from BBC Sport's contemporary reports of each transfer. Where the report mentions an initial fee potentially rising to a higher figure depending on contractual clauses being satisfied in the future, only the initial fee is listed in the tables.

Record transfer fees paid

Record transfer fees received

Club Transfer Record Progression

International caps 

 First capped player: Ivor Jones for Wales against Ireland on 14 February 1920.
 Most capped player:  Ashley Williams with 44 caps for Wales while at Swansea.

World Cup players
The following players have been selected by their country in the World Cup Finals, while playing for Swansea.
  Ivor Allchurch (1958)
  Len Allchurch (1958)
  Mel Charles (1958)
  Cliff Jones (1958)
  Terry Medwin (1958)
  Michel Vorm (2014)
  Jonathan de Guzmán (2014)
   Wilfried Bony (2014)
   Ki Sung-yueng (2014), (2018)
   Łukasz Fabiański (2018)
   Kristoffer Nordfeldt (2018)
   Martin Olsson (2018)
  Olivier Ntcham (2022)
  Joe Allen (2022)
  Ben Cabango (2022)

European Championship players
The following players have been selected by their country in the European Championship Finals, while playing for Swansea.
  Michel Vorm (2012)
  Gylfi Sigurðsson (2016)
  Łukasz Fabiański (2016)
  Neil Taylor (2016)
  Ashley Williams (2016)
  Connor Roberts (2020)
  Ben Cabango (2020)

African Cup of Nations players
The following players have been selected by their country in the Africa Cup of Nations Finals, while playing for Swansea.
   Reuben Agboola (1992)
   Wilfried Bony (2015), (2019)
   Andre Ayew (2019)
   Jordan Ayew (2019)

Asian Cup players
The following players have been selected by their country in the Asian Cup Finals, while playing for Swansea.
   Ki Sung-yueng (2015)

Copa América players
The following players have been selected by their country in the Copa América Finals, while playing for Swansea.
   Jefferson Montero (2015), (2016)

Award winners

PFA Team of the Year 
The following have been included in the PFA Team of the Year whilst playing for Swansea City :
 1978  Robbie James,  Alan Curtis (Fourth Division)
 1979  Ian Callaghan,  Alan Curtis (Third Division)
 1987  Terry Phelan,  Tommy Hutchison (Fourth Division)
 1988  Alan Davies (Fourth Division)
 1989  Chris Coleman (Third Division)
 1991  Chris Coleman (Third Division)
 1995  John Cornforth (Second Division)
 1997  Jan Mølby (Third Division)
 2000  Matthew Bound,  Nick Cusack (Third Division)
 2004  Lee Trundle (Third Division)
 2005  Lee Trundle,  Sam Ricketts (League Two)
 2006  Andy Robinson,  Lee Trundle (League One)
 2008  Jason Scotland,  Andy Robinson,  Ferrie Bodde,  Garry Monk,  Àngel Rangel (League One)
 2009  Jason Scotland,  Jordi Gómez (Championship)
 2010  Ashley Williams (Championship)
 2011  Ashley Williams,  Scott Sinclair (Championship)

Football League 100 Legends
The Football League 100 Legends is a list of "100 legendary football players" produced by The Football League in 1998, to celebrate the 100th season of League football. Four former Swansea players made the list.

  Trevor Ford
  Ivor Allchurch
  Cliff Jones
  Tommy Smith

Welsh Sports Hall of Fame
The following have played for Swansea and have been inducted into the Welsh Sports Hall of Fame :
  Ivor Allchurch
  Ron Burgess
  Cliff Jones
  John Toshack
  Terry Medwin

Swansea City End of Season Awards

Supporters' Player of the Year

Players Player' of the Year

Swans Personality of the Year

Away Player of the Year

Goal of the Season

Best Newcomer of the Year

Top Goalscorer

Young Player of the Season

Under-23 Player of the Season

Academy Player of the Season

Managerial records 

 First full-time manager: Walter Whittaker managed the club for two complete seasons, which included 75 matches, from 15 July 1912 to 25 April 1914.
 Longest serving manager by time: Haydn Green managed the club for 8 years, 4 months and 14 days, from 16 June 1939 to 29 October 1947.
 Longest serving manager by matches: Trevor Morris managed the club for 327 matches over a period of 6 years, 8 months and 14 days, from 27 August 1958 to 10 May 1965.

Club records

Goals
 Most League goals scored in a season: 92 in 46 matches, Fourth Division, 1976-77
 Most Premier League goals scored in a season: 54 in 38 matches, Premier League, 2013-14
 Fewest League goals scored in a season: 36 in 42 matches, Second Division, 1983-84
 Most League goals conceded in a season: 99 in 42 matches, Second Division, 1957-58
 Fewest League goals conceded in a season: 29 in 42 matches, Third Division (South), 1924–25
 Most League clean sheets in a season: 23 by Dorus de Vries, Championship 2009–10

Points
 Most points in a season:
Two points for a win: 62 in 42 matches, Football League Third Division South, 1948-49
Three points for a win:
92 in 42 matches, League One, 2007-2008
56 in 38 matches, Premier League, 2014–2015
 Fewest points in a season:
Two points for a win: 29 in 42 matches, Second Division, 1946-47
Three points for a win: 29 in 42 matches, Second Division, 1983-84

Matches

Firsts
 First competitive match: Swansea Town 1–1 Cardiff City, Southern Football League Division Two, 7 September 1912
 First Football League match: Portsmouth 3–0 Swansea Town, Third Division 28 August 1920
 First FA Cup match: Port Talbot 0–4 Swansea Town, Preliminary Round, 27 September 1913
 First League Cup match: Swansea Town 1–2 Blackburn Rovers, Second Round, 18 October 1960
 First Welsh Cup match: Swansea Town 3–1 Milford, Preliminary Round, 31 October 1912
 First European match: Swansea Town 2–2 Motor Jena, European Cup Winners' Cup first round, first leg, 16 October 1961
 First match at Vetch Field: Swansea Town 1–1 Cardiff City, Southern Football League Division Two, 7 September 1912
 First match at Liberty Stadium: Swansea City 1–1 Fulham, Friendly, 22 July 2005
 First competitive match at Liberty Stadium: Swansea City 1–0 Tranmere Rovers, League One, 6 August 2005
 First Premier League match: Manchester City 4–0 Swansea City, at the Etihad Stadium, 15 August 2011.
 First Premier League match played outside England: Swansea City 0–0 Wigan Athletic, at Liberty Stadium, 20 August 2011.
 First Premier League win: Swansea City 3–0 West Bromwich Albion, 17 September 2011.

Record wins
Record win: 12–0 against Sliema Wanderers, European Cup Winners' Cup First Round, first leg, 15 September 1982
Record League win:
8–1 against Bristol Rovers, Third Division South, 15 April 1922
8–1 against Bradford City, Second Division, 22 February 1936
8–0 against Hartlepool United, Fourth Division, 1 April 1978
Record FA Cup win:
8-1 against Notts County F.C., FA Cup Fourth Round Replay, 6 February 2018
Record European win: 12–0 against Sliema Wanderers, European Cup Winners' Cup First Round, first leg, 15 September 1982
Record home win: 12–0 against Sliema Wanderers, European Cup Winners' Cup First Round, first leg, 15 September 1982
Record away win: 6–4 against Bradford City, Third Division, 23 November 1990

Record defeats
Record League defeat: Fulham 8–1 Swansea Town, Second Division, 22 January 1938
Record FA Cup defeat: Liverpool 8–0 Swansea City, FA Cup Third Round Replay, 9 January 1990
Record European defeat: Monaco 8–0 Swansea City, European Cup Winners' Cup First Round, second leg, 1 October 1991
Record home defeat:
1–6 against Bradford Park Avenue, 14 September 1946
1–6 against Workington, 14 September 1965
1–6 against Reading, 23 September 1989
1–6 against Wigan Athletic, 6 April 1991
3–6 against Blackpool, 5 May 2007
Record away defeat:
8–0 against Liverpool, FA Cup, Third Round Replay, 9 January 1990
8–0 against Monaco, European Cup Winners' Cup First Round, second leg, 1 October 1991

Record consecutive results
 Longest unbeaten run (League):
19 matches from 4 February 1961 to 26 August 1961
19 matches from 19 October 1970 to 9 March 1971
 Longest winning streak (League): 9 matches, 27 November 1999 to 22 January 2000
 Longest losing streak (League): 9 matches, 26 January 1991 to 19 March 1991
 Longest drawing streak (League): 8 matches, 25 November 2008 to 28 December 2008
 Longest streak without a win (League): 15 matches, 25 March 1989 to 2 September 1989
 Longest scoring run (League): 27 matches, 28 August 1947 to 7 February 1948
 Longest non-scoring run (League): 6 matches, 6 February 1996 to 24 February 1996
 Longest streak without conceding a goal (League): 8 matches, 16 November 1999 to 28 December 1999

Attendances

 Highest home attendance:32,786 against Arsenal at Vetch Field, FA Cup Fourth Round, 17 February 1968
 Lowest home attendance:  1,301 against Northampton Town at Vetch Field, Division Four, 18 September 1973
 Highest attendance at Vetch Field: 32,786 against Arsenal, FA Cup Fourth Round, 17 February 1968
 Lowest attendance at Vetch Field: 1,301 against Northampton Town, Division Four, 18 September 1973
 Highest attendance at Liberty Stadium: 20,972 against Liverpool, Premier League, 1 May 2016
 Lowest attendance at Liberty Stadium: 9,675 against Gillingham, League One, 23 January 2007
 Highest Football League Attendance: 29,477 against Leeds United at the Vetch Field, Division Two, 1 October 1955
 Lowest Football League Attendance: 1,301 against Northampton Town at Vetch Field, Division Four, 18 September 1973
 Highest FA Cup Attendance: 32,786 against Arsenal at Vetch Field, Fourth Round, 17 February 1968
 Lowest FA Cup Attendance:  2,434 against Bognor Regis at Vetch Field, First Round, 17 November 1984
 Highest seasonal average league attendance: 
Pre-War: 16,118, Second Division, 1925–26
Post-War: 22,535, Third Division (South) 1948-49
 Lowest seasonal average league attendance: 2,052, Fourth Division, 1974–75.

Swansea City in Europe
Swansea qualified for Europe seven times via wins in the Welsh Cup, but since 1995, they have not participated in the tournament, as UEFA barred clubs playing in the English football league system from representing Wales in Europe. The question was raised again in 2011–12 when Welsh clubs playing in England were invited back into the Welsh Cup (Swansea did not enter), but UEFA reiterated their position. In doing so, however, they confirmed that Swansea would be able to represent England in Europe, if they qualified. The following season, Swansea qualified for Europe through England for the first time, as League Cup winners.

Record by season
Swansea City's scores are given first in all scorelines.

European attendance records 
 Highest home attendance: 19,567 against Napoli, 2013–14 UEFA Europa League Round of 32 first leg, 20 February 2014.
 Lowest home attendance: 5,130 against Sliema Wanderers, 1982–83 European Cup Winners' Cup First round first leg, 15 September 1982.
 Highest away attendance: 53,500 against Panathinaikos, 1989–90 UEFA Cup Winners' Cup First round first leg, 13 September 1989.
 Lowest away attendance: 3,250 against Sliema Wanderers, 1982–83 European Cup Winners' Cup First round second leg, 29 September 1982.

See also
List of Swansea City A.F.C. seasons

References
General

Bibliography

Specific

External links
 

Swansea City A.F.C.